Stereophallodon is an extinct genus of non-mammalian synapsids.

See also
 List of pelycosaurs

References

 The main groups of non-mammalian synapsids at Mikko's Phylogeny Archive

Ophiacodontids
Carboniferous synapsids of North America
Taxa named by Alfred Romer
Fossil taxa described in 1937
Prehistoric synapsid genera